Taylah Preston (born 27 October 2005) is an Australian junior tennis player. She has a career-high combined junior ranking of No. 10, and a career-high WTA ranking of No. 594.

Career

2022: WTA Tour debut
In January 2022, she lost in the second round of the Australian Open qualifying.

Preston made her WTA Tour main-draw debut at the Melbourne Summer Set 2, where she received a wildcard into the doubles draw partnering Alexandra Osborne. She also received a wildcard into the qualifying draw for the Melbourne Summer Set 1, where she defeated former French Open finalist, Sara Errani, in the first round, before falling to Destanee Aiava in the final round.

References

External links
 
 

2005 births
Living people
Australian female tennis players
Tennis players from Perth, Western Australia